Behestan (also Romanized as Behestān; also known as Bīstān) is a village in Bastam Rural District, in the Central District of Chaypareh County, West Azerbaijan Province, Iran. At the 2006 census, its population was 49, in 14 families.

References 

Populated places in Chaypareh County